Lee Keon-Pil (born 22 July 1985) is a South Korean footballer. His previous clubs were Busan Transportation Corporation F.C. and Gyeongju Korea Hydro & Nuclear Power F.C.

References

1985 births
Living people
South Korean footballers
Lee Keon-Pil
Association football defenders
Association football midfielders